Trouble Times Two is a Hardy Boys book by Franklin W. Dixon, published by Pocket Books in 2001.

Plot summary
A social studies project brings a newcomer Tom Gilliam into the Hardys' group at school. But he doesn't cooperate, gets in trouble and gets suspended. When Tom disappears and the Hardys discover suspicious activities at the shipping company, Frank and Joe have another case on their hands.

References

The Hardy Boys books
2001 American novels
2001 children's books